Séamus Kennedy (1947 – 7 May 2012) was an Irish cyclist. He won the Rás Tailteann in 1978.

Early life
Séamus Kennedy's parents were from Maharees, County Kerry. He was born in 1947.

Career
Séamus Kennedy competed in the Rás Tailteann every year between 1965 and 1981, winning it in 1978. His last appearance in the competition was in 1983.

Kennedy also won the 1968 Double Diamond Trophy.

In 1969, he won the Irish National Cycling Championships ½-mile, 25-mile and 100-mile road race. In 1975 he won the 3-mile race.

Personal and later life

Séamus Kennedy's home was in Kilcloon.

Legacy
The Séamus Kennedy Memorial Cycle takes place each year at Dunboyne.

References

Irish male cyclists
Rás Tailteann winners
Sportspeople from County Meath
1947 births
2012 deaths